Konstantinos Michail (1751 – 1816) was a philosopher, physician and linguist.

He was born in Kastoria. He spoke Greek, Latin, French and German and was a student of Michail Papageorgiou. He left all his books to the schools of Kastoria.

List of Macedonians (Greek)

literary works
Dietetics, Vienna 1794
Handbook of the Wise Doctor (Tissot)

External links 
List of Great Macedonians (15th-19th century)

Year of birth unknown
Year of death unknown
People from Kastoria
Greek Macedonians
Linguists from Greece
Macedonia under the Ottoman Empire
18th-century Greek scientists
18th-century Greek educators
18th-century Greek physicians
19th-century Greek scientists
19th-century Greek educators
19th-century Greek physicians
18th-century Greek writers
19th-century Greek writers